Outer Mongolia was the name of a territory in the Manchu-led Qing dynasty of China from 1691 to 1911. It corresponds to the modern-day independent state of Mongolia and the Russian republic of Tuva. The historical region gained de facto independence from Qing China during the Xinhai Revolution.

While the administrative region of Outer Mongolia during the Qing dynasty only consisted of the four Khalkha aimags (Setsen Khan Aimag, Tüsheet Khan Aimag, Sain Noyon Khan Aimag, and Zasagt Khan Aimag), in the late Qing period "Outer Mongolia" was also used to refer to the combined Khalkha and Oirat regions, as well as the directly-ruled Tannu Uriankhai.

The region was subsequently claimed by the Republic of China, which had acquired the legal right to inherit all Qing territories through the Imperial Edict of the Abdication of the Qing Emperor, as an integral part of the state. Most of Outer Mongolia, however, was under the de facto control of the Bogd Khanate, which was largely unrecognized internationally. The Republic of China briefly established de facto rule over most of the region from 1919 to 1921. After the Mongolian People's Republic was founded in 1924, the Nationalist government of China de jure recognized Mongolian independence in 1946 under Soviet pressure.

Names 
The name "Outer Mongolia" is contrasted with Inner Mongolia, which corresponds to the region of Inner Mongolia in China. Inner Mongolia was given its name because it was more directly administered by the Qing court; Outer Mongolia (which is further from the capital Beijing) had a greater degree of autonomy within the Qing empire.

There are three alternate terms including Ar Mongol, Mobei Mongol, and Outer Mongolia.

Ar Mongol 
The term Ar mongol or Mobei Mongol is sometimes used in Chinese and Mongolian languages to refer to North Mongolia when making a distinction with South Mongolia, so as to elide the history of Qing rule and rather imply a geographic unity or distinction of regions inhabited by Mongols in the Mongolian Plateau. There also exists an English term Northern Mongolia.

Ar Mongol can also be used to refer to Mongolia synchronically, during that time period. In the Mongolian language, the word ar refers to the back side of something, which has been extended to mean the northern side of any spatial entity, e.g. a mountain or a yurt. The word öbür refers to the south (and thus protected) side of a mountain. So the difference between South Mongolia and the Mongolian state is conceived as the metaphor of the backward northern side and the south side of a mountain.

In contrast to Mobei Mongol, there is also Monan Mongol, roughly referring to the region now known as South Mongolia.

Modern usage 
Today, "Outer Mongolia" is sometimes still informally used to refer to the independent state of Mongolia. To avoid confusion between Mongolia and China's Inner Mongolia, Chinese sources generally refer to the former as the "State of Mongolia"; that is, the translation of the official name in Mongolian, /, instead of just "Mongolia", which could refer to the entire Mongolian region.

See also 

 Mongolia under Qing rule
 Tannu Uriankhai
 Dzungaria
 Outer Northwest China
 Outer Manchuria
 Mongolia–Taiwan relations

Notes

References 

Geography of Mongolia
History of Mongolia
Inner Asia
.
States and territories established in 1644
States and territories disestablished in 1922
1644 establishments in China
1922 disestablishments in China
17th-century establishments in Mongolia
Territorial disputes of the Republic of China
Historical regions of China